The Albanian records in swimming are the fastest ever performances of swimmers from Albania, which are recognised and ratified by the Albanian Swimming Federation (FSHN).

All records were set in finals unless noted otherwise.

Long Course (50 m)

Men

Women

Short Course (25 m)

Men

Women

Mixed relay

Notes

References
General
Albanian Long Course records 31 August 2022 updated
Albanian Short Course records 31 August 2022 updated
Specific

External links
FSHN web site

Albania
Records
Swimming
Swimming